M. Sakthivel Murugan (died January 3, 2020) was an Indian politician and former Member of the Legislative Assembly. He was elected to the Tamil Nadu Legislative Assembly as an Anna Dravida Munnetra Kazhagam candidate from Ambasamudram constituency in the 2001 election. He died from a heart attack on 3 January 2020.

References 

All India Anna Dravida Munnetra Kazhagam politicians
2020 deaths
Year of birth missing
Place of birth missing
Place of death missing